In Greek mythology, Pleuron (Ancient Greek: Πλευρῶνος) was a son of Aetolus and Pronoe, daughter of Phorbus, and brother of Calydon. He was married to Xanthippe, daughter of Dorus, by whom he became the father of Agenor, Sterope, Stratonice, and Laophonte. Pleuron was said to have founded the town of Pleuron in Aetolia (and apparently was its eponym), but he had also a heroon at Sparta, erected by his great-granddaughter, Queen Leda.

Family tree

Notes

References 

 Apollodorus, The Library with an English Translation by Sir James George Frazer, F.B.A., F.R.S. in 2 Volumes, Cambridge, MA, Harvard University Press; London, William Heinemann Ltd. 1921. ISBN 0-674-99135-4. Online version at the Perseus Digital Library. Greek text available from the same website.
 Pausanias, Description of Greece with an English Translation by W.H.S. Jones, Litt.D., and H.A. Ormerod, M.A., in 4 Volumes. Cambridge, MA, Harvard University Press; London, William Heinemann Ltd. 1918. . Online version at the Perseus Digital Library
 Pausanias, Graeciae Descriptio. 3 vols. Leipzig, Teubner. 1903.  Greek text available at the Perseus Digital Library.

Greek mythological heroes
Kings in Greek mythology
Family of Calyce
Aetolian characters in Greek mythology
Religion in ancient Sparta